Blood & Ink Records is an American independent record label that specializes in Christian punk and Christian hardcore music. The label was founded in Richmond, Virginia, in the spring of 2002. The label has worked with such bands as Soul Embraced, as well as helping launch careers for Blessed by a Broken Heart, Burden of a Day and With Blood Comes Cleansing.

In July 2010, they re-released Strongarm's 1995 album, Atonement, the first time on vinyl.

Roster
 Church Tongue
 Debtor
 Dwell
 Infinite Me
 Jawbone
 New Heart
 Problem of Pain
 The Satire
 Slow Bullet
 Strengthen What Remains
 Thirtyseven
 Tigerwine
 The Virgin Birth
 Withered Bones
 With Increase

Affiliated
 Clear Convictions (formerly with Facedown Records and OnTheAttack Records)
 Figure Four (with Facedown Records and Solid State Records)
 No Innocent Victim (with Rescue Records, Facedown Records, Solid State Records, and Victory Records)
 Strongarm (with Solid State Records and Tooth & Nail Records)

Former
 All In
 The Attending
 Besieged
 Better Off
 Blessed by a Broken Heart
 The Blue Letter
 Burden of a Day
 Comrades
 The Culprits
 Dependency
 Divide the Sea
 Enlow
 Foreknown
 The Gentleman Homicide
 Household
 Ironwill
 Joy
 xLooking Forwardx
 Medford Drive
 Neshama
 New Waters
 Nourishtheflame
 Rapture of the Meek
 The Recession
 The Red Baron
 Saints Never Surrender
 Send Out Scuds
 Since Remembered
 Skylines
 Soul Embraced
 Stars Are Falling
 Ten 33
 Thin Ice
 TruthBeKnown
 Vagabonds
 Venia
 With Blood Comes Cleansing
 With Increase
 Yours for Mine

References

External links
 Official Blood & Ink Records site

American record labels
Record labels established in 2002
Christian record labels
Companies based in Richmond, Virginia
Punk record labels
Hardcore record labels
Heavy metal record labels
Christian hardcore
2002 establishments in Virginia